The Istanbul Region (Turkish: İstanbul Bölgesi) (TR1) is a statistical region in Turkey.

Subregions and provinces 

 Istanbul Subregion (TR10)
 Istanbul Province (TR100)

Age groups

Internal immigration

State register location of Istanbul residents

Marital status of 15+ population by gender

Education status of 15+ population by gender

See also 

 NUTS of Turkey

References

External links 
 TURKSTAT

Sources 
 ESPON Database

Statistical regions of Turkey